is a Japanese manga series written and illustrated by Ken Nagai. It was serialized in Shogakukan's Weekly Shōnen Sunday from March 27, 1996 to February 9, 2000. Its chapters were collected in six tankōbon volumes.

Plot 
The story follows a mysterious alien named Father and a boy presented as his son, Onnasky. Longing to become popular among women, they make bizarre plans every day in their apartment to pick up girls. Then they go to town, enact their stupid plans, and go home in vain. In this series, no detailed information is provided about the characters. Their conversation does not make sense sometimes, and Father's face is drawn intentionally out of proportion. These features generate uncomfortable, "off-key" feelings that result in a unique, peculiar humor, which is loved by many enthusiastic fans.

Manga 
Shinsei Motemote Ōkoku is written and illustrated by Ken Nagai. It started in issue #15 of Shogakukan's Weekly Shōnen Sunday on March 27, 1996, and finished in issue #9 of the magazine on February 9, 2000. The series was collected into six tankōbon volumes published by Shogakukan, released from January 18, 1997 to November 18, 1999.

Volume list

References

External links 
 Official Shogakukan manga web site 

Shogakukan manga
Shōnen manga
Comedy anime and manga